Quarterstick Records is a sublabel of Touch and Go Records.

Artists

Bad Livers
Calexico
DK3
Dead Child
June of 44
Kepone
The Mekons
Mi Ami
Peter Móren (of Peter, Bjorn and John)
Mule
Naked Raygun
Tara Jane O'Neil
Pegboy
Phono-Comb
Rachel's
Rodan
Henry Rollins
Shipping News
Sholi
The Sonora Pine
Therapy?
The Uglysuit
Volcano Suns
Shannon Wright

External links
Official site

See also
List of record labels

American independent record labels
Alternative rock record labels
Companies based in Chicago